Luis Francisco Ortiz (born September 22, 1995) is an American professional baseball pitcher for the Philadelphia Phillies of Major League Baseball (MLB). The Texas Rangers selected Ortiz in the first round of the 2014 Major League Baseball draft. He made his MLB debut in 2018. He has previously played in MLB for the Baltimore Orioles and San Francisco Giants.

Career
Ortiz is of Mexican American descent.

High school and international
Ortiz attended Sanger High School in Sanger, California. In his senior season he had a 1.04 ERA with 72 strikeouts and 7 walksin 43.2 innings, while missing a few starts due to forearm strain.

He was a closer for the 18-and-under USA Baseball national team that won a gold medal, and Ortiz won the World Cup MVP award. He had a win and three saves in five games with the team. ESPN.com's Keith Law ranked him No. 10 on his top-100 prospects list.  In November 2013, he committed to play college baseball at Fresno State University.

Texas Rangers
The Texas Rangers selected Ortiz in the first round of the 2014 Major League Baseball draft. He signed on June 11 for a signing bonus of $1.75 million.  Texas Rangers general manager Jon Daniels said "[He has] good pure stuff and is a strike thrower with a big fastball with life. His out pitch is a power slider. He has a repeatable delivery. He's a big-time competitor."

Ortiz reported to the 2014 AZL Rangers. After posting a 2.03 ERA in 13.1 innings in which he had 15 strikeouts, he was promoted to the Hickory Crawdads where he posted a 1.29 ERA in seven innings in which he had four strikeouts.

He spent 2015 with Hickory, going 4-1 with a 1.80 ERA in 13 games started, pitching 50 innings in which Ortiz had 46 strikeouts. He was named a South Atlantic League Mid-Season All Star. He was on the disabled list for over two months with right forearm strain.  He pitched for Surprise in the Arizona Fall League, and had a 1.80 ERA in five innings of relief.

After being ranked the #4 prospect in the Rangers system by Baseball America, Ortiz started 2016 with the High Desert Mavericks going 3-2 with a 2.60 ERA in 27.2 innings in seven games (six starts). He was then promoted to the Frisco RoughRiders, where he was 1-4 with a 4.08 ERA in 9 games (8 starts).

Milwaukee Brewers
On August 1, 2016, the Rangers traded Ortiz, outfielder Lewis Brinson, and outfielder Ryan Cordell to the Milwaukee Brewers for catcher Jonathan Lucroy and pitcher Jeremy Jeffress. He was assigned to the Biloxi Shuckers. In 22 games between High Desert, Frisco, and Biloxi, Oritz posted a 6-8 record with one save and a 3.08 ERA in 22 games (20 starts).  At the time his pitching repertoire consisted of a 93-96 mph plus fastball with some movement, an above-average 83-85 mph slider, and an average changeup.

After being ranked the #3 prospect in the Brewers system by Baseball America, Oritz returned to Biloxi in 2017. He pitched to a 4-7 record and 4.01 ERA in 94.1 innings pitched in 22 games (20 starts).

MLB.com ranked Ortiz as Milwaukee's fifth-best prospect going into the 2018 season, and Baseball America ranked him its #4 prospect. He began the season with Biloxi. In July, he represented the Brewers in the 2018 All-Star Futures Game.

Baltimore Orioles
On July 31, 2018, Ortiz, Jonathan Villar and Jean Carmona were traded to the Baltimore Orioles in exchange for Jonathan Schoop. Pitching for AAA Norfolk (with whom he was the youngest player on the team's roster at 22 years of age) and AA Biloxi in 2018, he was a combined 5-5 with two saves and a 3.70 ERA as in 22 games (17 starts) in 99.2 innings he gave up 26 walks and had 86 strikeouts.  Ortiz had his contract selected on September 4, 2018. He pitched 2.1 major league innings in 2018.

In 2019, Ortiz was optioned to the Norfolk Tides to open the season. After being put on the injured list on July 4, he made only one appearance the rest of the season. Ortiz was outrighted off the Orioles roster on October 30, 2019. He became a free agent on November 2, 2020.

Texas Rangers (second stint)
On December 16, 2020, Ortiz signed a minor league contract with the Texas Rangers. Ortiz spent the 2021 season with the Triple-A Round Rock Express. He made 28 appearances (4 starts), going 2–2 with a 4.60 ERA and 44 strikeouts in 44 innings. He became a free agent on November 17, 2021.

San Francisco Giants
On February 2, 2022, Ortiz signed a minor league contract with the San Francisco Giants. Pitching for AAA Sacramento in 2022, he was 4-3 with two saves and a 4.54 ERA in 35 games (four starts), as in 67.1 innings he had 13 walks and 72 strikeouts. In 2022 with the Giants, he was 0-0 with a 1.04 ERA in 8.2 innings.

Philadelphia Phillies
On November 9, 2022, Ortiz was claimed off waivers by the Philadelphia Phillies.

References

External links

1995 births
Living people
People from Sanger, California
Baseball players from California
American baseball players of Mexican descent
Major League Baseball pitchers
Baltimore Orioles players
San Francisco Giants players
Arizona League Rangers players
Hickory Crawdads players
Surprise Saguaros players
High Desert Mavericks players
Frisco RoughRiders players
Biloxi Shuckers players
Norfolk Tides players
Round Rock Express players
Sacramento River Cats players